Migdal is a Hebrew word for tower. It may refer to:

People
 Alexander Migdal (born 1945), Soviet, Russian and American physicist, son of Arkady Migdal
 Arkady Migdal (1911–1991), Soviet physicist
 Ted Migdal (1918–1999), American professional basketball player

Places
 Kfar Etzion, formerly called Migdal Eder, an Israeli settlement in the West Bank
 Migdal Afek, national park near Rosh HaAyin, Israel
 Migdal HaEmek, city in Israel
 Migdal Oz, an Israeli settlement in the West Bank
 Migdal (the ancient Magdala, near Tiberias)
 Migdal, Israel, local council in Israel

Buildings
 Migdal Synagogue, an ancient synagogue on the shore of the Sea of Galilee
 Shalom Meir Tower or Migdal Shalom Meir, an office tower in Tel Aviv, Israel
 Tower of Babel or Migdal Bavel
 Tower of David or Migdal David

Companies and organizations
 Migdal (company), an Israeli insurance company
 Migdal Or, an NGO
 Migdal Oz (seminary), an Israeli institution of Torah study for women, West Bank
 Zwi Migdal, a Polish Jewish organized crime group, based mainly in Argentina

See also 
 Hapoel Jerusalem B.C. or Hapoel Migdal Jerusalem, basketball club in Jerusalem
 Landau–Pomeranchuk–Migdal effect
 Majdal (disambiguation)
 Migdal Or (disambiguation)
 Migdol, a Hebrew word for tower